Yuval Shabtay is an Israeli footballer who plays for Hapoel Karmiel.

Honours

Club
Hapoel Be'er Sheva
Israel Super Cup (1): 2016
Toto Cup (1): 2016-17

External links

1986 births
Living people
Israeli Jews
Israeli footballers
Hapoel Ironi Kiryat Shmona F.C. players
Maccabi Ironi Kiryat Ata F.C. players
Maccabi Ahi Nazareth F.C. players
Hapoel Acre F.C. players
Hapoel Haifa F.C. players
Hapoel Ra'anana A.F.C. players
Hapoel Be'er Sheva F.C. players
Maccabi Petah Tikva F.C. players
Maccabi Ironi Tamra F.C. players
Hapoel Karmiel F.C. players
Liga Leumit players
Israeli Premier League players
Footballers from Karmiel
Israeli people of Libyan-Jewish descent
Association football defenders